Diane McGuinness (born 1933) is a cognitive psychologist who has written extensively on sex differences, education, learning disabilities, and early reading instruction. She currently holds the title of Emeritus Professor of Psychology at the University of South Florida. 

She received undergraduate and graduate degrees in psychology at the University of London: a Bachelor of Science at Birkbeck College (with first class honours), and a PhD at University College London. Over her academic career, she has published over 100 papers, chapters, and books on a number of subjects in the field of psychology.

McGuinness is an outspoken critic of whole language instruction but also of phonics as traditionally taught in the United States. She favors an approach to early reading instruction known as synthetic phonics or linguistic phonics, in which the starting point for instruction is the 40-odd phonemes of English. In synthetic phonics instruction, each sound is introduced initially with a single "basic code" spelling, e.g. the /ee/ sound is connected to the 'ee' spelling. Students are taught to read by blending all of the sounds in the word. Spelling alternatives for sounds (e.g. for /ee/ the spellings 'y' as in funny, 'ea' as in eat, 'e' as in reflex, 'ie' as in cookie, etc.) are taught later. McGuinness has also introduced the term "code overlap" to describe a spelling (or grapheme) that can stand for more than one sound (phoneme), e.g. the spelling 'ow' can stand for the /ou/ sound as in the word now, or for the /oe/ sound as in the word snow. 

McGuinness has stirred up controversy for her views on dyslexia and teaching letter names. She argues that dyslexia is not a biological condition but a socially created problem that results from a complex spelling code and ineffective teaching methods. She has argued against teaching the letter names in the early phases of instruction on the grounds that letter names can confuse students. What is important, McGuinness argues, is that students be taught the relationships between sounds and letters.

Written Works
When Children Don't Learn, Basic Books (New York City), 1985.
(Editor) Dominance, Aggression, and War, Paragon House Publishers (New York City), 1987.
Evolution: The Transdisciplinary Paradigm, ICUS Books, 1987.
Why Our Children Can't Read, and What We Can Do about It, Free Press (New York City), 1997.
My First Phonics Book, Dorling Kindersley (New York City), 1999.
Growing a Reader from Birth: Your Child's Path from Language to Literacy, W.W. Norton and Co. (New York, NY), 2004.
Early Reading Instruction: What Science Really Tells Us about How to Teach Reading, MIT Press (Cambridge, MA), 2004.
Language Development and Learning to Read: The Scientific Study of How Language Development Affects Reading Skill, MIT Press (Cambridge, MA), 2005.
Sound Steps to Reading: Parent/Teacher Handbook (Foolproof, Scripted Lessons for Reading and Spelling), Trafford Publishing, 2008.
Sound Steps to Reading: Sound-Targeting Storybook, Trafford Publishing, 2008.

References

External links
 A synopsis of McGuinness' views on reading instruction can be found in the following article:  A Prototype for Teaching the English Alphabet Code Reading Reform Foundation Newsletter (49)

Scholarly reviews of McGuinness' recent books:
Harvie, Paul. (Review) McGuinness, Diane. Early Reading Instruction: What Science Really Tells Us about How to Teach Reading (2004). Reading in a Foreign Language, Volume 17, No. 1, April 2005 
Hellsten, Meeri. (Review) McGuinness, Diane (2005). Language Development and Learning to Read: The Scientific Study of How Language Development Affects Reading Skill. Cambridge, MA: The MIT Press. Education Review, University of Michigan.

Living people
Alumni of Birkbeck, University of London
Alumni of University College London
1933 births